Orecta acuminata is a species of moth of the  family Sphingidae. It is known from Argentina.

Adults are on wing in January.

References

Ambulycini
Moths described in 1923